Caro Dana Dawes (née Blymyer; January 6, 1866 – October 3, 1957) was the wife of Vice President Charles G. Dawes, and thus second lady of the United States from 1925 to 1929.  

Caro Blymyer married Charles Dawes on January 24, 1889. They had two children and adopted two more. After the death of their son Rufus in 1912, the Daweses retreated from social life and instead devoted much of their energies to charity work.

While serving as Second Lady, Dawes disappointed the social elite of Washington, D.C. because she declined many social invitations. Nonetheless, it was observed that her "manner was sweet and gentle, her conversation cultured, and her dignity unimpeachable."

Dawes died on October 3, 1957, and is buried along with her husband in Rosehill Cemetery.

Notes

|-

1866 births
1957 deaths
Burials at Rosehill Cemetery
People from Cincinnati
Second ladies of the United States
Dawes family